Stephen Simpson (born 8 January 1984) is a South African-American professional racing driver currently competing in the IMSA WeatherTech SportsCar Championship and previously in the A1 Grand Prix, Champ Car Atlantic Championship and the Indy Pro Series, among others.

Biography
Simpson was born on 8 January 1984 in Poole, Dorset, England and he moved to South Africa with his family when he was 10 months old. He studied at the South African College High School and graduated in 2002. He moved to the US in pursuit of his motor sport career in 2006 and became a naturalized US citizen in 2018.

Early career
Simpson began karting at the age of 8 and won several regional and national karting titles in South Africa.

In 2000 Simpson became the youngest ever driver to win the South African Formula Ford Championship, at the age of 16. In 2001 Simpson left his native South Africa to compete in the Slick 50 Formula Ford Zetec Championship in the UK. Despite poor funding the youngster was highly impressive beating factory teams on a number of occasions and culminating in being awarded the Motorsport News Race Ace award for his performance at Donington Park. He ended the season with a stirring performance in atrocious conditions at Brands Hatch in the Formula Ford Festival.

For 2002 Simpson was signed by Durango to compete in the European Formula Renault Championship and Italian Championship, however his season was dogged by bad luck and a serious lack of testing.

Just weeks before the 2003 season got underway, a potential sponsor pulled out, leaving Simpson with no alternatives and thus without a drive for the season. Simpson instead concentrated on his fitness and continued looking for the right drive.

For 2004 Simpson joined Richard Dean's Team JLR, with which he contested the prestigious British Formula Renault Championship. He finished second in the Winter Series with two wins and five podiums to his name.

2005–2008
Simpson was brought in to race in the inaugural A1 Grand Prix World Cup of Motorsport in winter 2005, helping A1 Team South Africa to a dismal 17th place in the series. His best result was a third place in the Feature Race in Dubai and he also achieved a fifth at his home event. Simpson also continued to drive for Team JLR in British Formula Renault.

For 2006 he was signed to drive for Gelles Racing in the Champ Car Atlantic Series but he left the series after three races, with a best finish of 5th. Towards the end of the year he had a test with Champ Car World Series team Mi-Jack Conquest Racing and reportedly impressed the team with his performance.

In 2007 he signed with Kenn Hardley Racing to compete in the Indy Pro Series. He struggled with the oval races on the series, but finished well on the road and street courses, recording a season best 3rd-place finish at the Mid-Ohio Sports Car Course and finished 9th in the championship. Kenn Hardley Racing shut down at the end of the season and its assets were sold. He then enjoyed a number of very strong outings for the Creation/AIM LMP1 team in Europe and America before the 2008 recession resulted in the closure of the team and he was again left without a drive.

2014 to date
After a challenging few years without any race driving, Simpson was back in a full time race seat in 2014 driving for JDC-Miller MotorSports in the Tudor United SportsCar Championship. The highlight of the season was a 3rd-place finish at Road America. In 2015 Simpson raced in selected races in the Tudor United SportsCar Championship and finished 3rd at the Daytona 24 Hours, 2nd at Detroit and had a Pole Position at Lime Rock Park. During 2015 Simpson was also a race driver for LAP Motorsport, the official team of MINI USA.

Simpson won the PC class of the Daytona 24 hours in 2016, part of the WeatherTech SportsCar Championship.

The team moved up to the top prototype category for 2017 and enjoyed a number of podium finishes. For 2018 he continues to race for JDC-Miller MotorSports in the top Prototype class of the IMSA Weathertech Championship alongside teammates Misha Goikhberg and Chris Miller in an Oreca Gibson LMP2 car, winning the 2018 Sahlens 6 Hours of the Glen at Watkins Glen. He also races with Michael Johnson for the same team in the Continental Tire Sports Car Challenge in an Audi RS3 TCR car.

Complete WeatherTech SportsCar Championship results
(key) (Races in bold indicate pole position) (Races in italics indicate fastest lap)

References

 A1 GP South Africa site – Driver biography page

External links
 Stephen Simpson web site

1984 births
Living people
Indy Lights drivers
South African racing drivers
Atlantic Championship drivers
Italian Formula Renault 2.0 drivers
British Formula Renault 2.0 drivers
Formula Renault Eurocup drivers
A1 Team South Africa drivers
American Le Mans Series drivers
European Le Mans Series drivers
WeatherTech SportsCar Championship drivers
24 Hours of Daytona drivers
Alumni of South African College Schools
Extreme Speed Motorsports drivers
JDC Motorsports drivers
Bryan Herta Autosport drivers
A1 Grand Prix drivers
Durango drivers
DAMS drivers
Michelin Pilot Challenge drivers